Ceratopemphigus zehntneri, is an aphid in the superfamily Aphidoidea in the order Hemiptera. It is a true bug and sucks sap from plants. It is known to form galls on Ligustrum robustum. It is one of two endemic aphids on Sri Lanka.

References

Eriosomatinae
Agricultural pest insects
Arthropods of Sri Lanka